Bord Bia (English: Food Board) is an Irish state agency with the aim of promoting sales of Irish food and horticulture both in Ireland and abroad.

Bord Bia works for small producers by promoting and certifying farmers' markets, and for bigger producers by offering international marketing services.

History

Bord Bia was founded in 1994 as an amalgamation of the Coras Beostoic agus Feola (the Meat and Livestock Board) and the food promotion activities of the Irish Trade Board. In 2004, it amalgamated with Bord Glas, which used to be responsible for the development of the horticulture industry. In 2009, Bord Bia took over the promotion of seafood from BIM (Bord Iascaigh Mharaigh).

Part of the organisation's work is "promoting better ways of producing, by innovation and setting 'best practice' standards". According to the 2010 report Pathways for Growth, published by Bord Bia, Ireland should:"adopt a strategy of developing a world-class agricultural industry by 2016 and set itself the goal of becoming the most efficient, most highly innovative food and drink country in the world."

Organisation

Bord Bia acts as a link between Irish producers and their customers worldwide. For that purpose, it has several overseas offices in, amongst other cities, Amsterdam, Shanghai and New York City.

In 2008, Bord Bia received 30 million euros for an advertising campaign in the period 2008–2013. In 2009, the "Oireachtas Grant-in-Aid" was 28 million a year. With other incomes (earmarked grants, levies and so on) the organisation had a budget in 2009 of about 43.5 million euros.

Developments

Bord Bia is mostly known for its certification of Irish food products under the label Origin Green, through which it launched the world's first national sustainability food program. The logo connected to this scheme is used at home and abroad.

In May 2011, Bord Bia published their goal of increasing food exports by 40% in 2020 compared with the 2010 level.

References

External links
 Bord Bia

Food and drink companies of Ireland
Food and drink in Ireland